The Burial is an upcoming American courtroom drama film directed by Maggie Betts and written by Doug Wright. It is based on the real story of lawyer Willie E. Gary and his client Jeremiah Joseph O'Keefe's lawsuit against the Loewen funeral company, as documented in the 1999 New Yorker article of the same name by Jonathan Harr. It stars Jamie Foxx, Tommy Lee Jones, Jurnee Smollett, Mamoudou Athie, and Bill Camp.

The film is scheduled to be released by Amazon Studios.

Premise
In 1995, Willie E. Gary, an unconventional personal injury lawyer with an impressive track record, helps bankrupt funeral homeowner Jeremiah Joseph O'Keefe sue the Loewen funeral company led by Raymond Loewen as a result of a contractual dispute. Gary ultimately won a $500 million jury verdict and the Loewen company filed for bankruptcy.

Cast

 Jamie Foxx as Willie E. Gary
 Tommy Lee Jones as Jerry O'Keefe
 Jurnee Smollett
 Mamoudou Athie
 Bill Camp as Raymond Loewen
 Dorian Missick
 Pamela Reed
 Amanda Warren
 Jim Klock
 Alan Ruck
 Billy Slaughter
 Lance E. Nichols as James E. Graves Jr.

Production
The film is an adaptation of Jonathan Harr's article "The Burial", published in 1999 by The New Yorker. The project was originally developed at Warner Bros. In March 2018, Amazon Studios announced it was developing the film with Doug Wright writing the script and Alexander Payne in talks to direct. By November 2020, Maggie Betts came on board to direct with Jamie Foxx attached to star and produce. In October 2021, Tommy Lee Jones joined the cast in a role Harrison Ford was considered for. In November, Jurnee Smollett was added to the cast. Principal photography took place in New Orleans, starting in March 2022.

References

External links
 

Amazon Studios films
American films based on actual events
American legal drama films
Drama films based on actual events
Films about funerals
Films based on newspaper and magazine articles
Films produced by Trudie Styler
Films set in Mississippi
Films shot in New Orleans
Upcoming films
Upcoming English-language films